The Ministry of Horticulture is a Ministry of the Government of Maharashtra 
state. 

The Ministry is headed by a cabinet level Minister. Sandipanrao Bhumre is Current Minister of Horticulture Government of Maharashtra.

Head office

List of Cabinet Ministers

List of Ministers of State

References 

Government of Maharashtra
Government ministries of Maharashtra